The following is an episode list for the anime adaptation of the Da Capo series of games, including Da Capo: Second Season. The D.C. anime first season, animated by Zexcs, originally aired from 5 July to 27 December 2003 on the Japanese network TV Kanagawa. Based on the original visual novel's scenario where the player chooses Nemu, it featured the central characters of the game, while omitting some of the details of the other scenarios. As it was a general-audience anime, the explicit scenes of the original game were likewise omitted. Many episodes were accompanied by bonus material, such as music videos or side stories. The unique thirteen Side Episodes, although released concurrently with D.C., were produced by a different staff than the D.C. anime.

The second season Da Capo: Second Season, animated by Feel, aired from 2 July to 24 December 2005, also on TV Kanagawa. Da Capo: Second Season includes the premise and characters from the manga Da Capo: Second Graduation released in 2004, but the character development and plot progression are very different. The cast also includes characters from the expansion game Da Capo: Plus Situation. A notable difference between the two seasons is Jun'ichi's character design. It is believed that this production is intended to connect the original game to its sequel, Da Capo II, as the sequel game contains references to Da Capo: Second Season. Unlike the first season, there was no bonus material accompanying the series' broadcast.

Both seasons are available on DVD, but there is no official English release of this series at this time. The Da Capo Side Episodes were released separately from the regular episodes in their own DVDs, but the DVD-BOX release of Da Capo placed both regular and Side episodes on the same discs.

Summary of series

Da Capo

Da Capo: Side Episodes

Da Capo: Second Season
D.C.: S.S, takes place two years after Nemu and Sakura left Hatsune-Jima.

Da Capo If
Da Capo: If, is a two episode alternative timeline of the second season, where Jun'ichi Asakura returned Kotori Shirakawa's feelings.

References

2003 Japanese television seasons
Episodes
D.C.: Da Capo